Sophie Renoir (born 1964) is a French actress. She is the great-granddaughter of the French Impressionist painter Pierre-Auguste Renoir (1841–1919), and daughter of the cinematographer Claude Renoir (1913–1993), granddaughter of actors Pierre Renoir and Véra Sergine, and grand-niece of film director Jean Renoir. 

In 1988, she was nominated for César Award for Most Promising Actress for her part in Boyfriends and Girlfriends by Eric Rohmer.

Filmography 

 1978 : Attention, les enfants regardent
 1981 : Les Babas Cool
 1982 : Le Beau Mariage
 1983 : Julien Fontanes, magistrat
 1987 : Boyfriends and Girlfriends

References

1964 births
French film actresses
Living people
20th-century French actresses
Sophie